Manila is a census-designated place located adjacent to Humboldt Bay in Humboldt County, California. The ZIP Code is 95521. The population was 784 at the 2010 census.

History
The town was founded at the end of World War II, and named after Manila in the Philippines.  Humboldt Coastal Nature Center of Friends of the Dunes on Stamps Lane includes the Stamps Dune House and surrounding dune landscape. The house was originally built in 1985 as a retirement home of a couple whose heirs sold a large part of their property and the house to Manila-based Friends of the Dunes to use as a nature center on the dunes in 2007.

Demographics
The 2010 United States Census reported that Manila had a population of 784. The racial makeup of Manila was 686 (87.5%) White, 14 (1.8%) African American, 25 (3.2%) Native American, 5 (0.6%) Asian, 0 (0.0%) Pacific Islander, 12 (1.5%) from other races, and 42 (5.4%) from two or more races. Hispanic or Latino of any race were 30 persons (3.8%).

The Census reported that 777 people (99.1% of the population) lived in households, 7 (0.9%) lived in non-institutionalized group quarters, and 0 (0%) were institutionalized.

There were 368 households, out of which 86 (23.4%) had children under the age of 18 living in them, 94 (25.5%) were opposite-sex married couples living together, 40 (10.9%) had a female householder with no husband present, 25 (6.8%) had a male householder with no wife present.  There were 34 (9.2%) unmarried opposite-sex partnerships, and 4 (1.1%) same-sex married couples or partnerships. 150 households (40.8%) were made up of individuals, and 28 (7.6%) had someone living alone who was 65 years of age or older. The average household size was 2.11.  There were 159 families (43.2% of all households); the average family size was 2.91.

The population was spread out, with 152 people (19.4%) under the age of 18, 47 people (6.0%) aged 18 to 24, 259 people (33.0%) aged 25 to 44, 259 people (33.0%) aged 45 to 64, and 67 people (8.5%) who were 65 years of age or older.  The median age was 38.1 years. For every 100 females, there were 117.2 males.  For every 100 females age 18 and over, there were 122.5 males.

The homeowner vacancy rate was 1.2%; the rental vacancy rate was 3.6%.  335 people (42.7% of the population) lived in owner-occupied housing units and 442 people (56.4%) lived in rental housing units.

Government

See also

References

Census-designated places in Humboldt County, California
Populated places established in 1945
Census-designated places in California
Populated coastal places in California